Erzurum Airport  is a military and public airport serving the city of Erzurum in eastern Turkey. Inaugurated in 1966, it is located 11 km from the city. The airport's public passenger terminal covers an area of 5,750 m2 and has an open-air parking lot for 200 cars.

Airlines and destinations

Traffic Statistics 

(*)Source: DHMI.gov.tr

Incidents
 On 15 September 2012, an Armenian cargo aircraft landed here while en route to Aleppo, Syria, so that Turkish authorities could check for arms. Coming less than a week after a jetliner of Syrian Arab Airlines was forced to land in Ankara due to suspicion of carrying arms, this stop was planned and agreed on beforehand.
 On 21 October 2015, an airliner did an emergency landing while en route from Vienna to Abu Dhabi to offload a Slovakian economy class passenger who was handcuffed and arrested for using the closer business class lavatory after getting airsickness. The passenger was accommodated in a hotel overnight by the Turkish authorities and given a ticket to get back to her home country via Istanbul. The Slovakian ambassador to Turkey sent a letter of thanks to the airport authorities for taking care of their citizen.

References

External links

Erzurum Airport

Airports in Turkey
Architecture in Turkey
Buildings and structures in Erzurum Province
Transport in Erzurum Province